Banphai School is a public high school located in Banphai, Khon Kaen, Thailand, in the Khon Kaen's subdivided district area.

History
The school was established in 1948 and serves students in grades 7-12.  Which is a coeducation and part of Office of the Basic Education Commission in Thailand.  Located on 16.816 Acre.

Schedule
Banphai School runs on a 7 periods schedule. Each period is 50 minutes long.

Motto
The motto consist of Thai Language . It means in English with 4 Phrases
 Good Learning
 Sport Concerning
 Being Disciplined
 Stand on Morality

References

External links
 

Educational institutions established in 1948
1948 establishments in Thailand
Schools in Thailand